Ingrid Patricia Morales Muñoz (born May 29, 1975 in San José) is a beach volleyball player from Costa Rica, who played in the Swatch FIVB World Tour 2005 at the Acapulco step, playing with Nathalia Alfaro.

Representing her native country during the 2007 Pan American Games Beach Volleyball tournament, she finished 9th.

She won the silver medal at the 2008 NORCECA Beach Volleyball Circuit (Santo Domingo).

At her home country, she has won five consecutive beach volleyball Championships, since 2005 to 2009.

Indoor Volleyball
With her National Indoor Team she played at the 2002 Central American and Caribbean Games and the 2006 version, finishing 6th and 7th. Also she played at the 2006 FIVB Women's World Championship.

References

External links
 
 
 FIVB Indoor Profile
 

1975 births
Living people
Costa Rican women's volleyball players
Costa Rican beach volleyball players
Women's beach volleyball players
Pan American Games competitors for Costa Rica
Beach volleyball players at the 2007 Pan American Games
Beach volleyball players at the 2011 Pan American Games
Sportspeople from San José, Costa Rica